The Jesus Record is the ninth and final album by American singer and songwriter Rich Mullins, released posthumously on July 21, 1998, ten months after his death.

The first disc of the album, entitled "The Jesus Demos", consists of nine rough demos Mullins recorded for the album in an abandoned church on September 10, 1997, nine days before his death. The songs were meant for a concept album based on the life of Jesus Christ, to be called Ten Songs About Jesus.

The second disc was recorded after Mullins' death by a Ragamuffin Band (Rick Elias, Mark Robertson, Jimmy Abegg and Aaron Smith), with guest vocals by Amy Grant, Michael W. Smith, Ashley Cleveland, and Phil Keaggy. Orchestration for the album, arranged and conducted by Tom Howard, were recorded at London's Abbey Road Studios. The album ends with the rough demo version of "That Where I Am, There You...", with added instruments and vocals by the Ragamuffin Band, Michael W. Smith and a large choir of family and friends. The last thing heard on the album are the faint sounds of "Nothing But the Blood of Jesus", played by Mullins on the Hammered Dulcimer. The recording, which was made during a 1997 concert performance in Green Bay, Wisconsin, barely made it onto the final album. Two men, who were helping Elias find potential recordings, searched countless church video libraries, bootleg tape traders lists, professional video tapers, music message boards, email discussion lists and other sources, before someone came forward with a tape that was made at the Green Bay church. This person was able to rush the tape to the two men doing the extensive search, who then rushed it to Elias who was mastering the album. The tape arrived on the final day of mastering, just barely in time to be included.

The entire album was performed live at the 1998 Cornerstone Music Festival by a Ragamuffin Band, who then embarked on "The Homeless Man Tour" as a tribute to Mullins' memory.

Track listing

Disc One: The Jesus Demos
 "Hard to Get" (Rich Mullins) – 4:41
 "All The Way to Kingdom Come" (Rich Mullins) – 3:18
 "My Deliverer" (Rich Mullins, Mitch McVicker) – 3:18
 "Surely God Is With Us" (Mark Robertson, Beaker) – 3:48
 "Jesus..." (Rich Mullins, Mitch McVicker, Dana Waddel) – 4:34
 "You Did Not Have a Home" (Rich Mullins) – 2:27
 "Heaven in His Eyes" (Rich Mullins) – 4:00
Earlier recording appeared on Behold the Man 1981
 "Nothing Is Beyond You" (Rich Mullins, Mitch McVicker, Tom Booth) – 3:40
 "That Where I Am, There You..." (Rich Mullins) – 2:45

Disc Two: The Jesus Record
 "My Deliverer" – 5:59
 "Surely God Is With Us" – 4:29
 "Nothing Is Beyond You" – 4:19
 "You Did Not Have a Home" – 2:57
 "Jesus..." – 6:05
 "All The Way to Kingdom Come" – 3:51
 "Man of No Reputation" (Rick Elias) – 6:04
 "Heaven In His Eyes" – 4:05
Earlier recording appeared on Behold the Man 1981
 "Hard To Get" – 4:55
 "That Where I Am, There You..." – 3:21

Charts

Radio single

Personnel 

 Rich Mullins – lead vocals, guitar on tracks 1, 2, 4, 6, 9 and piano on tracks 3, 5, 7, 8 of The Jesus Demos
 Mitch McVicker – backing guitar on track 9 of The Jesus Demos
 The Ragamuffins are – Rick Elias, lead vocals on tracks 1, 4, 6, 7, 9, backing vocals, guitar, harmonica on tracks 4, 7; Aaron Smith, drums; Mark Robertson, bass guitar, lead vocals on tracks 2, 4, 6, backing vocals; Jimmy Abegg, guitars, lead vocals on tracks 4, 6, backing vocals for The Jesus Record
 Amy Grant – lead vocals on "Nothing Is Beyond You" for The Jesus Record,  backing vocals on tracks 9, 10
 Ashley Cleveland – lead vocals on "Jesus..." for The Jesus Record, backing vocals on tracks 1, 9
 Phil Keaggy – lead vocals on "All The Way To Kingdom Come" for The Jesus Record
 Michael W. Smith – lead vocals on "Heaven In His Eyes" and "That Where I Am, There You..." for The Jesus Record, backing vocals on tracks 1, 10
 Rick Elias – lead vocals on "My Deliverer", "You Did Not Have a Home", "All The Way To Kingdom Come", "Man of No Reputation" and "Hard to Get" for The Jesus Record, backing vocals on track 3
 Mark Robertson – lead vocals on "Surely God Is With Us", "You Did Not Have a Home" and "All The Way To Kingdom Come" for The Jesus Record
 Jimmy Abegg – lead vocals on "You Did Not Have a Home" and "All The Way To Kingdom Come" for The Jesus Record
 Jim Chaffee – backing vocals on tracks 2, 3, 4, 6, 8, 10 of The Jesus Record
 Linda Elias – backing vocals on tracks 3, 4, 6 of The Jesus Record

Additional musicians

 Tom Howard – piano on tracks 1, 3, 5, 7, 8, Wurlitzer on track 8, orchestrations on tracks 1, 3, 5, 7, 8, orchestra arrangement on tracks 1, 5, 7, string arrangements on track 3, string quartet arrangement on track 8, conducting on tracks 1, 3, 5, 7, 8 of The Jesus Record
 Phil Madeira – B-3 on tracks 1, 2, 7, 8, 9, 10, lap steel on track 2, dobro on track 4, accordion on track 10 of The Jesus Record
 Eric Darken – percussion on tracks 1, 2, 3, 5, 6, 7, 8, 9, 10 of The Jesus Record
 Sam Levine – pennywhistle on track 1, flute on track 5, recorder on track 9 of The Jesus Record
 Jerry McPherson – additional guitars on tracks 3, 6, 8, 9, 10 of The Jesus Record
 Kenny Greenberg – additional guitars on track 6 of The Jesus Record
 Tim Lauer – Mellotron on track 3, accordion on tracks 4, 7, harmonium on track 9 of The Jesus Record
 Rich Mullins – guitars and lead vocals on track 10 of The Jesus Record
 Mitch McVicker – guitars on track 10 of The Jesus Record
 Linda Elias – percussion on tracks 6, 10 of The Jesus Record
 Children's Choir on "My Deliverer" for The Jesus Record
 Emily Webb
 Ashley Melling
 Brittany Hargest
 Megan Dockery
 Chris White
 Matthew White
 Brandon Hargest
 Sterling Gibson
 Adult Choir on "My Deliverer" for The Jesus Record
 Roz Thompson
 Steve Flanigan
 Nicole Coleman-Mullen
 George Pendergrass
 Percy Travis III
 Melinda Doolittle
 Scat Springs
 Ann Bailey
 Choir on "That Where I Am, There You..." for The Jesus Record
 Mark Lutz
 Elizabeth Lutz
 Connie Hawk
 David McCracken
 Nicole Hemphill
 Hardy Hemphill
 Michelle Younkman
 Stuart Young
 Mary Quick
 Michael Oliver
 Kurt Lightner
 Laura Davis
 Lea Fulton
 Eric May
 Kevin Tucker
 Dawn Gates
 Laura Neutzling
 Marie Lehman
 Chuck Hargett
 Janice Chaffee
 Jim Chaffee
 Chuck Nelson
 Mari O'Neill
 Jamie Kiner
 Ann Bailey
 Roz Thompson
 Jemina Abegg
 Alexia M. Abegg
 Pierette Abegg
 Augdrey Eva Smith
 Kathryn Garcia Smith
 Aaron Smith
 Sydney Maria Smith
 Gloria Green
 Michelle Abegg
 Rebecca Brown
 Chris Smith
 Janice Smith
 Archie Griffin
 Rose Corazza
 Kristin Pierson
 Keith Bordeaux
 London Session Orchestra
 Gavyn Wright – violin, leader
 Wilf Gibson – violin
 Becca Hirsch – violin
 Pat Kiernan – violin
 Perry Mason – violin
 Bog Kostecki – violin
 Rolf Wilson – violin
 John Bradbury – violin
 Jim McLeod – violin
 Ben Cruft – violin
 Phill Dukes – viola
 George Robertson – viola
 Bill Hawkes – viola
 Caty Wilkinson – viola
 Tony Pleeth – cello
 Johnathan Williams – cello
 Paul Kegg – cello
 Frank Schaeffer – cello
 Chris Laurence – double bass
 Paul Cullington – double bass
 John Pigneguy – horn
 Frank Lloyd – horn
 Mike Thompson – horn

Production

 Jim Chaffee – A&R direction, executive producer
 Judith Volz – A&R direction, executive producer
 Jamie Kiner – A&R direction
 Beth Lee – art direction, design
 Jimmy Abegg – art direction, design
 Ben Pearson – art direction, design, photography
 Rick Elias – producer
 Russ Long – engineer
 Peter Cobbin – orchestra and string quartet engineer
 Jordan Richter – additional engineer
 Chris Grainger – assistant engineer
 Tim Rauter – assistant engineer
 The White House, Nashville, Tennessee – recording studio
 Ragamuffin Recorders, Brentwood, Tennessee – recording studio
 The Carport, Nashville, Tennessee – recording studio
 Soundstage, Nashville, Tennessee – recording studio
 Darkhorse Studio, Franklin, Tennessee  – recording studio
 Abbey Road Studios, London, England – orchestra and string quartet recording studio
 Fred Paragano – digital editing
 Lynn Fuston – additional digital editing
 David Schober – additional digital editing
 Ted Bahas – additional digital editing
 J.R. McNeely – mixing at the Sound Kitchen, Franklin, Tennessee
 Mat5t – mixing assistant
 Todd Gunnerson – mixing assistant
 Tim Coyle – mixing assistant
 Hank Williams – mastering at Mastermix, Nashville, Tennessee
 Kristin Pierson – production coordinator
 William Morris Agency – booking

References 

Rich Mullins albums
1998 albums
Albums published posthumously